Pedro André Caseiro Portela (born 6 January 1990) is a Portuguese handball player for HBC Nantes and the Portuguese national team.

He represented Portugal at the 2020 European Men's Handball Championship.

References

External links

1990 births
Living people
Portuguese male handball players
People from Leiria
Sporting CP handball players
Expatriate handball players
Portuguese expatriate sportspeople in France
Handball players at the 2020 Summer Olympics
Sportspeople from Leiria District